Ragtime is a children's television series created by  Michael Cole and presented by Maggie Henderson and Fred Harris. The programme features play with words, songs, stories and puppets. Puppets made by Joanne Cole emerge from the green Ragtime Bag, including wooden spoons with faces drawn on them. These are named Mr Porridge, Mr Curry, Mr Jelly, Miss Sponge, Mrs Custard, Uncle Casserole and Mrs Ragamuffin. Other puppet regulars include  Dax and Sniff (both dogs), Humbug the tiger and Bubble, a cushion-shaped toy.

The music was provided by Peter Gosling and Dave Moses.

In 1973 the series won a Society of Film and Television Award (later known as a BAFTA) for Best Children's Programme.

Although a book and record were produced at the time, no episodes are currently available on DVD. Although regularly repeated until 1980, only eight of the twenty six episodes remain in the BBC's archive, due to a decision in the early 1990s to wipe the master tapes of many 1970s children's programmes .

References

External links
Television Heaven, Watch With Mother Episode Guide
Off The Telly, The Story of Watch With Mother
 

BBC children's television shows
British television shows featuring puppetry
1973 British television series debuts
1975 British television series endings
Lost BBC episodes
1970s British children's television series